Phlebia coccineofulva, commonly known as the scarlet waxcrust, is a species of crust fungus in the family Meruliaceae. It was described as a new species by Lewis David de Schweinitz in 1832. The fungus is found in North America, continental Europe, and northern Asia, where it grows as a saprophyte on decaying stumps and woody forest debris.

References

Fungi described in 1832
Fungi of Asia
Fungi of Europe
Fungi of North America
Meruliaceae